Drimiopsis maculata, also known by the common names little white soldiers, African false hosta, leopards ears, African hosta, leopard plant, and Injoba is a flowering plant species in the genus Drimiopsis. It is the type species of its genus. It occurs from Tanzania to South Africa.

Scillascillin-type homoisoflavanones can be isolated from D. maculata.

References

External links 

Scilloideae
Plants described in 1851
Flora of South Africa
Flora of Tanzania